Monsters. is a 2019 Romanian drama film directed and written by Marius Olteanu. It stars  Judith State, Cristian Popa, Alexandru Potrocean, Șerban Pavlu and Dorina Lazăr. The plot is divided in three chapters and follows a day in the life of Dana (State) and Arthur (Popa), a childless married couple, who tries to understand their ongoing marital crisis.

The film is the directorial debut of Olteanu. It premiered on February 9, 2019 at the 69th Berlin International Film Festival. It received generally positive reviews from film critics.

References

External links 
 

Romanian drama films
2019 drama films
2010s Romanian-language films
Films set in Bucharest
2019 films
Gay-related films